Barbara of Brandenburg (1422 – 7 November 1481) was a Marchioness consort of Mantua, married in 1433 to Ludovico III Gonzaga, Marquis of Mantua. She was referred to as a virago because of her strong character and forceful nature, and served as Regent of Mantua several times during the absence of Ludivico III between 1445 and 1455. She is regarded as an important figure in the Italian Renaissance and was a student of Vittorino da Feltre.

Life
Barbara was the daughter of John, Margrave of Brandenburg-Kulmbach, and Barbara of Saxe-Wittenberg and a great-niece by marriage of Holy Roman Emperor Sigismund.

Her engagement took place on 5 July and marriage took place on 12 November 1433 in Mantua, when she was only ten years old, and she spent the latter part of her childhood in Mantua. Her marriage had been arranged partially by her uncle the Emperor. She had been engaged to Joachim of Stettin in the peace treaty between Brandenburg and Stettin in 1427, but the engagement was broken and Joachim was engaged to her sister Elizabeth instead.

After her marriage, she was given a thorough Renaissance education with the other children of the Marquis of Mantua. She was a student of Vittorino da Feltre and instructed in rhetoric, mathematics, philosophy, music, drawing, fencing, riding, swimming and ball sports. She was tutored in Greek and language and able to speak four languages. She was well educated in literature and became known as one of the most well-educated women of the early Renaissance.

In 1444, her spouse became Marquis of Mantua, and she was given the title Marchioness of Mantua and became the first lady of the Mantovan court. She was active as the political adviser of her spouse with the responsibility of foreign diplomatic correspondence, in particular when it pertained to relations between Mantua and Germany. Between 1445 and 1455, she frequently acted as Regent of Mantua during the absence of her spouse, and the later economic success of Mantua has sometimes been attributed to her policy.

When the Council of Mantua was held in the city from 27 May 1459 to 19 January 1460, summoned by Pope Pius II to launch a crusade against the Ottoman Turks who had conquered Constantinople, it was an event of the highest prestige for Mantua. This was also an event Barbara had successfully worked for a long time prior. During this meeting, Barbara participated in Dynastic policy negotiations, resulting in the marriage of her son to Margaret of Bavaria and her daughters to the Duke of Wurttemberg and the Count of Gorizia, and her daughter Dorothea to the heir of Milan.

Her spouse died in 1478. She had some influence in the early reign of her son. She died in 1481.

Barbara of Brandenburg acted as a mecenate and patron of arts, and contributed to make Mantua a center of arts and culture in Renaissance Italy.

Fiction
Barbara is portrayed in the novel The Princess of Mantua by French writer Marie Ferranti.

Issue

During her marriage, Barbara gave birth to fourteen children:

 Federico (1438? – died in infancy).
 Maddalena (1439? – died in infancy).
 Elisabetta (1440? – died in infancy).
 Federico I (1441–1484), Marquis of Mantua.
 Francesco (1444–1483), created Cardinal by Pope Pius II.
 Paola Bianca (1445–1447), died in infancy.
 Gianfrancesco (1446–1496), Count of Sabbioneta and Lord of Bozzolo; married Antonia del Balzo.
 Susanna (1447–1481), a nun at Santa Paola di Mantua.
 Dorotea (1449–1467), married to Galeazzo Maria Sforza, Duke of Milan.
 Cecilia (1451–1472), a nun at Santa Chiara di Mantua.
 Rodolfo (1452–1495), Lord of Castiglione delle Stiviere, Solferino, Suzzara and Poviglio; married firstly Antonia Malatesta and then Caterina Pico.
 Barbara (1455–1503), married in 1474 Eberhard I, Duke of Württemberg.
 Ludovico (1460–1511), Bishop of Mantua.
 Paola (1463–1497), married Leonhard, Count of Gorizia.

Ancestry

Notes

Bibliography
 Ebba Severidt: Familie, Verwandtschaft Und Karriere Bei Den Gonzaga: Struktur Und Funktion Von Familie Und Verwandtschaft Bei Den Gonzaga Und Ihren Deutschen Verwandten 1444-1519. DRW, 2002. ISBN 978-3799552455

External links

1422 births
1481 deaths
Marchionesses
House of Hohenzollern
House of Gonzaga
15th-century German people
15th-century Italian nobility
15th-century German women
15th-century Italian women
15th-century women rulers
Daughters of monarchs